Brookvale Bus Depot is a bus depot in the Sydney suburb of Brookvale operated by Keolis Downer Northern Beaches.

History
Following the closure of the Manly tram network in 1939, all Northern Beaches buses had been stabled at the increasingly overcrowded former Manly Tram Depot. To alleviate this, a new depot opened on 5 October 1952 on Pittwater Road, Brookvale.

As of November 2022, it has an allocation of 230 buses. In October 2021 it was included in the transfer of region 8 from State Transit to Keolis Downer Northern Beaches.

References

External links
Service NSW

Bus garages
Industrial buildings in Sydney
Transport infrastructure completed in 1952
1952 establishments in Australia